Suderu (also Romanized as Sūderū, Soodroo, and Sūdrū) is a village in Tazian Rural District, in the Central District of Bandar Abbas County, Hormozgan Province, Iran. At the 2006 census, its population was 708, in 138 families.

References 

Populated places in Bandar Abbas County